Macrobathra sikoraella is a moth in the family Cosmopterigidae. It was described by Viette in 1956. It is found in Madagascar.

References

Natural History Museum Lepidoptera generic names catalog

Macrobathra
Moths described in 1956